Folke Bergman (29 August 1902 — 22 May 1946) was  a Swedish explorer and archaeologist.

Biography
Hans Folke Bergman was born at  Klara parish in  Stockholm, Sweden.
He participated in the 1924–1926  excavations of Stora Torget in Visby. From 1929–1935, he participated  in the Sino-Swedish Expedition as a member of the Sino-Swedish Northwest China Scientific Inspection Team led by Sven Hedin (1865-1952). He is best known for his discovery of the Xiaohe Tomb complex in Lop Nur, China  during 1934. Another of his finds, the Juyan bamboo strips of the Han dynasty, :zh:居延漢簡 (Inner Mongolia, 1930), is known for its transportation from Beiping to Hong Kong, then to the USA, and finally to Taiwan, in a preservation effort during the Sino-Japanese war.

Literature

Primary
Folke Bergman: Archäologische Funde. In: Petermanns Geographische Mitteilungen 1935, Gotha 1935, Seiten 292-293.
Folke Bergman: Lou-Lan Wood-Carvings and Small Finds Discovered by Sven Hedin. In: Bulletin of the Museum of Far Eastern Antiquities 7 (1935), S. 71-144.
Folke Bergman: Archaeological Researches in Sinkiang. Especially in the Lop-Nor Region. (Reports from the Scientific Expedition to the Northwestern Provinces of China under the Leadership of Dr. Sven Hedin / Scientific Expedition to the North-Western Provinces of China: Publication 7). Thule, Stockholm 1939 (englisch; das grundlegende Werk über die damaligen archäologischen Funde in der Wüste Lop Nor mit wichtigem Kartenmaterial; dieses Werk wurde erst um das Jahr 2000 in die chinesische Sprache übersetzt und ist dann für die chinesische Archäologie in Xinjiang bedeutsam geworden).
Sven Hedin und Folke Bergman: History of an Expedition in Asia 1927–1935. Reports: Publication 24 - 4 : Part II 1928 - 1933 Statens Etnografiska Museum, Stockholm 1943.
Sven Hedin und Folke Bergman: History of an Expedition in Asia 1927–1935. Reports: Publication 25: Part III 1933-1935, Statens Etnografiska Museum, Stockholm 1944.
Folke Bergman: Travels and Archaeological Field-work in Mongolia and Sinkiang: a Diary of the Years 1927-1934. In: Sven Hedin und Folke Bergman: History of an Expedition in Asia 1927–1935. Part IV: 1933–1935. General reports, travels and field-work. (Reports: Publication 26.), Statens Etnografiska Museum, Stockholm 1945.
Johannes Maringer und Folke Bergman: Contribution to the prehistory of Mongolia : A study of the prehistoric collections from inner Mongolia. (Reports: Publication 34 = 7, 7.) Thule, Stockholm 1950. 
Bo Sommarström: Archaeological researches in the Edsen-gol region, Inner Mongolia. Together with the catalogue prepared by Folke Bergman. Statens Etnografisk Museum, Stockholm 1956–1958. 2 Bde. (Reports … Publication 39. VII, 8–9.)
Folke Bergman: The Kansu-Hohsi Corridor and the Suloho-Ochinaho drainage regions. (Reports: Publication 50 : 1, Geography ; 4, Sven Hedin Central Asia atlas : memoir on maps ; Vol. 3, Fasc. 3) Etnografiska Museet, The Sven Hedin Foundation, Stockholm 1980.

Secondary
 Hedin, Sven: Central Asia atlas, Stockholm, Statens etnografiska museum, Stockholm 1966. In diesem Atlas sind die Reiserouten der Expeditionsteilnehmer eingetragen. Siehe dazu: Hedin, Sven: Zum Zentralasien-Atlas und Haack, Hermann: Sven Hedins Zentralasien-Atlas. In: Petermanns Geographische Mitteilungen, 87. Jahrgang 1941, Seite 1 bis 7, Verlag Justus Perthes, Gotha.
 V. H. Mair: The rediscovery and complete excavation of Ördek's Necropolis. In: Journal of Indo-European Studies 34, 2006, Heft 3/4, S. 273–318 (Grundlegender Grabungsbericht in englischer Sprache).
 Alfried Wieczorek und Christoph Lind: Ursprünge der Seidenstraße. Sensationelle Neufunde aus Xinjiang, China. Ausstellungskatalog der Reiss-Engelhorn-Museen, Mannheim. Theiss, Stuttgart 2007.   (Neue Funde auf den Grabungsstätten von Folke Bergman.)
 Carter, T: Paper and block printing - from China to Europe., Seite 86. In: Crowley, D., Heyer, P., (Hrsg.): Communication in history: technology, culture, society. Pearson Allyn & Bacon, 2007.

References

External links
 'Archaeological Researches in Sinkiang: Vol. 1,', Folke Bergman, Digital Silk Road Project, Digital Archive of Toyo Bunko Rare Books

Swedish explorers
Swedish archaeologists
1902 births
1946 deaths
20th-century archaeologists